Omar Jasika and Naoki Nakagawa are the defending champions, but they chose not to participate.
Félix Auger-Aliassime and Denis Shapovalov won the title, defeating Brandon Holt and Riley Smith in the final, 7–5, 7–6(7–3).

Seeds

Draw

Finals

Top half

Bottom half

External links 
 Draw

Boys' Doubles
US Open, 2015 Boys' Doubles